The 1968 2. divisjon was a Norwegian second-tier football league season.

The league was contested by 16 teams, divided into two groups; A and B. The winners of group A and B were promoted to the 1969 1. divisjon. The two lowest placed teams in both groups were relegated to the 3. divisjon.

Overview

Summary
Start won group A with 24 points. Hødd won group B with 19 points. Both teams were promoted to the 1969 1. divisjon.

Tables

Group A

Group B

References

Norwegian First Division seasons
1968 in Norwegian football
Norway
Norway